The Arizona Department of Transportation (ADOT) is an Arizona state government agency charged with facilitating mobility within the state. In addition to managing the state's highway system, the agency is also involved with public transportation and municipal airports. The department was created in 1974 when the state merged the Arizona Highway Department with the Arizona Department of Aeronautics.

ADOT was a pioneer in the use of rubberized asphalt as a method to increase durability and reduce road noise on state highways while providing an opportunity to recycle scrap tires.

Former U.S. Secretary of Transportation Mary Peters had previously been a Director of ADOT. The current Federal Highway Administrator, Victor Mendez, was also previously a Director of ADOT.

ADOT's publications division publishes Arizona Highways magazine.

ADOT Divisions

Aeronautics Division
The Aeronautics Division, now a part of the Multimodal Planning Division, promotes aviation in the state, license aircraft dealers, assists in the development of public airport projects and manages Grand Canyon National Park Airport.

Intermodal Transportation Division
ADOT's Intermodal Transportation Division (ITD) traces its roots back to 1909 with the establishment of the post of Territorial Engineer, to 1912 with the creation of the Office of State Engineer and to 1927 when the Arizona State Highway Department was created. Divided into 11 groups and 10 engineering districts, the ITD is responsible for building and maintaining Arizona's highway infrastructure. It is overseen by the State Engineer. Currently it is headed by State Engineer (Deputy Director of Transportation) Dallas Hammit ITD has had many successful engineers partake in many national events such as WASHTO. For the last couple of years, MD Iqbal Hossain has been taking a part of WASHTO.

Motor Vehicle Division
The Motor Vehicle Division (MVD) is responsible for driver licensing and vehicle registration. It has 1600 employees and an annual operating budget of $72 million. Currently it is headed by ADOT Assistant Director Eric Jorgensen.

As of FY 2009, the MVD has 6,693,413 license plates registered with the department.

Enforcement and Compliance Division
It utilizes certified peace officers to enforce transportation related laws and regulations.

The Enforcement and Compliance Division was originally the enforcement component of the Motor Vehicle Division. Created in 2010 by former division Director, Terry Connor (retired Arizona DPS Commander), the Division separated from the Motor Vehicle Division to improve the enforcement capabilities of the department. Under current Division Director Tim Lane, the division continues to provide the state of Arizona a highly trained agency to protect Arizona's infrastructure. The Enforcement and Compliance Division has 3 separate units: the Enforcement Services Bureau, Office of Inspector General and the Executive Hearing Office.

The Enforcement Services Bureau (ESB) utilizes certified police officers to enforce state and federal commercial vehicle regulations. Stationed at Port of Entry stations, mobile scale teams and MVD offices, these officers are trained to perform a variety of duties and also enforce fuel tax laws. The Bureau also assists other state, local and federal agencies when needed.

The Office of Inspector General (OIG) utilizes detectives to deter theft, fraud and other crimes as well as assisting other state, local and federal agencies.

The Executive Hearing Office (EHO) employees an Administrative Law Judge and staff on driver license hearings and other administrative cases.

Multimodal Planning Division
The Multimodal Planning Division (MPD) is the arm of ADOT involved in transportation planning. As its name suggests, the mandate for the MPD deals with creating plans for various modes of transport, including highways and public transit at both a regional and statewide level. Currently it is headed by ADOT Assistant Director Scott Omer.

Freeway signs
ADOT is noted for using pop-culture references to catch commuters eyes and deliver important safety tips on the electronic overhead signs. References have included Star Wars, Star Trek, and Pokémon Go.
Signs have included:
 "Drinking & Driving go together like Peas and Guac"
 "Awaken your inner force. Focus on the road."
 "Texting and driving leads to the dark side."
 "The force is strong with you. Put down the phone."
 "Be a rebel, not a clone. Put down the phone."
 "Road rage? Let the Wookiee win."
 "Drive Sober Live Long and Prosper"

See also
 Vehicle registration plates of Arizona

References

External links
 Official website
 Arizona Highways magazine website
 Arizona Roadway Conditions
 Arizona Driver License and Types

1974 establishments in Arizona
Government agencies established in 1974
Motor vehicle registration agencies
Transportation
State departments of transportation of the United States
Transportation in Arizona